The Fort Walton Jets were a professional minor league baseball team based in Fort Walton Beach, Florida from 1953 until 1962. The club  played in the Class-D Alabama–Florida League.

References
Baseball Reference

Defunct Alabama-Florida League teams
Defunct baseball teams in Florida
Baseball teams established in 1953
Baseball teams disestablished in 1962
Cincinnati Reds minor league affiliates
Washington Senators minor league affiliates
Minnesota Twins minor league affiliates
1953 establishments in Florida
1962 disestablishments in Florida
Fort Walton Beach, Florida